Marsh Farmhouse is an historic building in Thornton-Cleveleys, Lancashire, England. Built in 1803, it is a Grade II listed building. It is located to the southeast of today's Amounderness Way roundabout at Victoria Road West (known as Ramper Road at the time).

The farmhouse is in brick with stone dressings, partly rendered, with a concrete tiled roof.  It has two storeys and a symmetrical two-bay front.  The central doorway has a semicircular relieving brick arch with stone imposts and a keystone inscribed with the name "B. F. Hesketh Esq 1803", referring to Bold Fleetwood Hesketh, son of Fleetwood Hesketh and Frances Bold. The windows are sashes.

Hesketh died in 1819, aged 57, and was buried in the churchyard of St Chad's Church, Poulton-le-Fylde, alongside his parents.

See also
Listed buildings in Thornton-Cleveleys

References

Sources

External links
Marsh Farm – Thornton Through Time 

1803 establishments in England
Houses completed in 1803
Grade II listed buildings in Lancashire
Houses in Lancashire
Farmhouses in England
Buildings and structures in the Borough of Wyre
The Fylde